Louis-Jean-François Lagrenée (called Lagrenée l'aîné, Lagrenée the elder) (30 December 1724 – 19 June 1805) was a French rococo painter and student of Carle van Loo.  He won the Grand Prix de Rome for painting in 1749 and was elected a member of the Académie royale de peinture et de sculpture in 1755.  His younger brother Jean-Jacques Lagrenée (called Lagrenée le jeune, Lagrenée the younger) was also a painter.

Lagrenée's notable career appointments included:
 Court painter to Elizabeth, Empress of Russia.
 Director of the Academy of Arts in Saint Petersburg.
 Director of the French Academy in Rome.
 Professor-rector of the Académie royale de peinture et de sculpture.
 Honorary director-curator of the Louvre museum.

In July 1804,  Napoleon I conferred upon Lagrenée the rank of chevalier (Knight) of the Legion d'Honneur.

Lagrenée died in June 1805, aged 80 years and 6 months.

Early life

Lagrenée was born in Paris on 30 December 1724 and from an early age he showed promise in drawing and painting. During his youth, master painter members of the French Royal Academy offered a rolling programme of courses, open to the public (for a small fee), in life drawing and the principles and techniques of art.  These courses gave academy members a chance to identify and nurture six of the most gifted young students in any given year and offer them a place on a scheme known as the École royale des élèves protégés, a scheme which offered free tuition with a small stipend, for three years,  preparing students for Prix de Rome competitions. After being selected for and completing this three-year programme, under the tutelage of Carle van Loo, Lagrenée won the Grand Prix de Rome on his first attempt in 1749, with the painting Joseph interpreting the dreams of Pharaoh (now lost).

Study in Rome

As a student at the French Academy in Rome, Lagrenée developed a "Formative if youthful fixation with Baroque painting".  Above all, Lagrenée was inspired by the Bolognese School, particularly by the work of Guido Reni (1575–1642) and Francesco Albani (1578–1660).  Later in his career, Lagrenée acquired the epithet 'the French Albani' (l'Albane Francais).

Academy membership

After returning from Rome in 1753, Lagrenée set to work on a large painting - The abduction of Dejaneira by the centaur Nessus (musée du Louvre) - which, when finished in 1755, was the reception piece which earned him  membership of the Académie de peinture et de sculpture, by a unanimous vote. By this time, Lagrenée was already considered something of a celebrity.

By royal appointment

St.Petersburg
Lagrenée's career blossomed in Paris, by completing many commissions for eminent patrons and members of a flourishing new financial community as well as submitting regular entries to Paris salon exhibitions.  His reputation caught the attention of Elizabeth Petrovna, Empress of Russia, who, in 1760, appointed him to the office of the director of the Academy at St. Petersburg and that of her principle painter.

Paris
After only two years in Russia, Lagrenée returned to Paris to take up the appointment of professor-rector of the Académie royale de peinture et de sculpture.

Rome
Lagrenée spent the years between 1781 and 1787 at the Villa Medici in Rome, in his capacity as director of the French Academy (Académie de France à Rome).

Paris
A final return to Paris saw Lagrenée appointed to the position of honorary curator-director (administration) of the Louvre museum, a position which he held until his death in 1805.

Legion of Honour

Lagrenée was made a Knight of the Legion of Honour (Legion d'honneur) on 15 July 1804 by  Napoleon I.

Public records
On Monday 10 July 1758, at the age of 33, Lagrenée married 16-year-old Anne-Agathe Isnard.  Fifty-five years later, on 19 June 1805, Lagrenée's death certificate recorded that they were still married.

Works in Public Collections (non exhaustive)

Paintings
 Paris, musée du Louvre : L'Enlèvement de Déjanire par le centaure Nessus (1755), Mercure, Aglaure et Hersé (1767), Psyché surprend l'Amour endormi (1768), La Mort de la Femme de Darius (1785), L'Amour des Arts console la Peinture des écrits ridicules et envenimés de ses ennemis
 Stockholm, Nationalmuseum : Mars et Vénus surpris par Vulcain (1768)
 Musée national des châteaux de Versailles et de Trianon : La Moisson - Cérès et l'Agriculture (vers 1770)
 Los Angeles, Getty Center : Vénus et Mars, une allégorie de la Paix (1770) 
 Musée des beaux-arts de Quimper : Esther et Assuérus (1775–1780)
 Musée des arts décoratifs de Paris : Jupiter transformé en taureau enlève Europe, Thétys reçoit Apollon
 Detroit Institute of Arts : Pygmalion and Galatea, (1781)
 Palace of Fontainebleau : The death of the Dauphin, surrounded by his family, (1765)
Lyon Cathedral, Saint John the Evangelist on the Island of Patmos, (1758)

Tapestries

 Collection of mythological subjects, after six paintings, acquired by the administration royale for the  manufacture d'Aubusson, 1759:  
 Aurore enlève Céphale, whereabouts of cartoon unknown.
 Jupiter transformé en taureau enlève Europe, carton conserved at the musée des Arts décoratifs de Paris
 Vénus aux forges de Lemnos, cartoon described by Denis Diderot after the salon of 1759, tapestry conserved at the musée départemental de la tapisserie d'Aubusson 
 Borée enlève Orythie, whereabouts unknown. 
 Thétys reçoit Apollon, cartoon conserved at the musée des Arts décoratifs, Paris 
 Mercure apporte Bacchus aux nymphes de Nysa, also known as La Naissance de Bacchus, tapestry conserved at the Mobilier National, Paris.

Gallery

Students
 Antoine-Denis Chaudet (1763–1810)
 Lagrenée le Jeune (the younger), (his brother)
 Pierre Peyron (1744–1814)

References

Bibliography
 Benezit Dictionary of Artists
 Marc Sandoz, Les Lagrenée, I. Louis (Jean, François) Lagrénée, 1725–1805, Tours, 1983
 Pascal-François Bertrand, « La tenture des sujets mythologiques d'après Lagrenée l'aîné reconstituée », dans Aubusson, tapisseries des Lumières, Paris, Aubusson, 2013

External links 

 Lagrenée l’Ainé in the French National archive: Joconde

Prix de Rome for painting
1724 births
1805 deaths
Rococo painters
Painters from Paris
18th-century French painters
French male painters
19th-century French painters
19th-century French male artists
18th-century French male artists